Mazzuma is a mobile payments ecosystem that uses Artificial Intelligence and Blockchain to facilitate transactions. Its headquarters is located in Accra, Ghana.

History 
Mazzuma was founded in 2015 by Kofi Genfi and Nii Osae Dade who were both named in Forbes Africa 30 under 30 Technology category in 2018. Mazzuma currently has over 300,000 customers that use its service to make payments and receive remittances.

Mazzuma's platform uses its service to make payments and receive remittances.

It's partner companies include MTN Ghana, Vodafone, United Nations Development Programme, AirtelTigo,  RemitONE, National Entrepreneurship and Innovation Plan and Crypto Valley.

Mazzuma has processed  transactions and with its Application Programming Interface (API), integrated  E-commerce stores and developers into its system.

In November 2021, Mazzuma was part of a collaboration between the Binance Smart Chain’s $1 Billion Growth Fund and CV VC to drive blockchain adoption in Africa. Mazzuma was also one of 4 African blockchain startups to secure funding and support from CV VC.

References

External links 

 Official Website

Financial services companies of Ghana
Financial services companies established in 2015
Companies based in Accra